Natan Carneiro de Lima (born November 9, 1990 in Pé de Serra), is a Brazilian football midfield who plays for Vitória da Conquista.

Honours
Santa Cruz
Campeonato Pernambucano: 2011, 2012, 2013
Campeonato Brasileiro Série C: 2013

Cuiabá
Campeonato Mato-Grossense: 2017

External links
 Natan at ZeroZero
  Ogol
  Soccerway

1990 births
Living people
Brazilian footballers
Santa Cruz Futebol Clube players
Criciúma Esporte Clube players
Cuiabá Esporte Clube players
Club Sportivo Sergipe players
Sociedade Esportiva Decisão Futebol Clube players
Esporte Clube Primeiro Passo Vitória da Conquista players
Campeonato Brasileiro Série B players
Campeonato Brasileiro Série C players
Campeonato Brasileiro Série D players
Association football midfielders